Leon Sperling (7 August 1900 – 15 December 1941) was a Polish Olympic footballer.

Sperling was born in Kraków, and was Jewish. He was a football forward, playing on the left wing. Sperling represented Cracovia, the team he led in 1921, 1930, and 1932 to the Championship of Poland. He also played in 16 games for the Polish National Team, including Poland's lone game at the 1924 Paris Olympic Games. He was regarded as a highly skilled dribbler. He also coached in Lviv. Sperling is one of Cracovia Kraków's legends. 

Sperling was shot to death by the Nazis in the Lwów Ghetto in December 1941. His Jewish teammate, Józef Klotz, was also killed in the Holocaust.

See also
List of select Jewish football (association; soccer) players

References

1900 births
1941 deaths
Deaths by firearm in Poland
Footballers at the 1924 Summer Olympics
Jewish Polish sportspeople
Footballers from Kraków
Austro-Hungarian Jews
Association football forwards
Jewish footballers
MKS Cracovia (football) players
Male murder victims
Murdered Jews
Olympic footballers of Poland
People murdered in Poland
Polish Jews who died in the Holocaust
People who died in the Lwów Ghetto
Poland international footballers
Polish civilians killed in World War II
Polish footballers
Polish people executed by Nazi Germany
People executed by Nazi Germany by firearm